Raimondo Van Riel (22 January 1881, in Rome – 9 May 1962, in Mentana) was an Italian actor.

Raimondo Van Riel was born on January 22, 1881, in Rome, Lazio, Italy. He is known for his work on Quo Vadis? (1924), The Magnificent Rogue (1935) and Scipione l'africano (1937). He was married to Aidé Bongini. He died on May 9, 1962, in Rome.

Selected filmography

 Fiamma simbolica (1918)
 La ladra di fanciulli (1920)
 The Sack of Rome (1920)
 L'amica (1920)
 Primavera (1921)
 La morte piange, ride e poi... (1921)
 Le tre ombre (1921)
 The Youth of the Devil (1921)
 L'amico (1921)
 Un fiore nel fango (1921)
 La congrega dei ventiquattro (1921)
 Tre persone per bene (1922)
 La tormenta (1922)
 The Betrothed (1922)
 La madre folle (1923)
 Un viaggio nell'impossibile (1923)
 Quo Vadis? (1924) - Tigellinus
 Il cammino delle stelle (1924)
 'Nfama! (1924)
 La giovinezza del diavolo (1925) - Il diavolo
 The Fiery Cavalcade (1925)
 Zigano (1925) - Herzog Ludowico
 Der Kampf gegen Berlin (1926) - William Tesborn
 Lives in Danger (1926) - Emilio Reval
 Risa e lacrime napoletane (1926) - Mimi'o Guappo
 Beatrice Cenci (1926)
 El moroso de la nona (1927)
 I rifiuti del Tevere (1927)
 The Golden Abyss (1927) - Ein Sträflingsanführer
 Behind the Altar (1927) - Becelli
 The Strange Case of Captain Ramper (1927)
 The Last Performance of the Circus Wolfson (1928) - Der Satan, Pantomime
 Escape from Hell (1928)
 Life's Circus (1928) - Gaston Flamingo
 Gaunerliebchen (1928) - Cremer
 Die Republik der Backfische (1928) - Thomas van Santen
 Knights of the Night (1928) - Mimile
 Das letzte Souper (1928) - Zemikoff
 Kif Tebbi (1928)
 Der Herzensphotograph (1928) - Ein Abenteuerer
 Dva pekelné dny (1928) - Dr. Van Straaten
 My Heart is a Jazz Band (1929) - Jack
 Misled Youth (1929) - Der 'Bananenpeter'
 Ship in Distress (1929) - Flavio, Marios Freund
 The Smuggler's Bride of Mallorca (1929) - Tolomeo
 The League of Three (1929) - Baramo
 Busy Girls (1930)
 You'll Be in My Heart (1930) - Krassow
 Die Jagd nach der Million (1930) - Baron Falcone
 Achtung! – Auto-Diebe! (1930) - Robert Radek
 Im Kampf mit der Unterwelt (1930) - Verbrecher
 Wellen der Leidenschaft (1930) - Mart Martens
 Before the Jury (1931) - Il procuratore generale
 Mother Earth (1931) - Un contadino nella taverna
 The Devil's Lantern (1931)
 Figaro and His Great Day (1931) - Un delegato di polizia
 Queen of the Night (1931) - Lo sconosciuto
 Patatrac (1931) - Il creditore alto
 Lorenzino de' Medici (1935) - Benvenuto Cellini
 Luci sommerse (1936)
 Scipio Africanus: The Defeat of Hannibal (1937) - Maharbale
 Blood Red Rose (1939)
 Two Million for a Smile (1939) - L'oste
 Il ponte dei sospiri (1940)
 Il leone di Damasco (1942)
 The Gorgon (1942) - Pietro Capronesi
 L'apocalisse (1947)
 Baron Carlo Mazza (1948) - Zio Casimiro Pezza
 Letter at Dawn (1948) - Paolo
 City of Pain (1948) - Don Felice
 Welcome, Reverend! (1950)
 Margaret of Cortona (1950) - messer Dal Monte
 First Love (1959) - Nonno di Andreina
 Esterina (1959)
 Ben Hur (1959) - Old Man (uncredited) (final film role)

References

External links

1881 births
1962 deaths
Italian male film actors
Italian male silent film actors
Male actors from Rome
20th-century Italian male actors